Ascot railway station, or Ascot train station, may refer to:

 Ascot railway station (Berkshire), a railway station in Ascot, Berkshire, England
 Ascot railway station, Brisbane, a railway station in Ascot, Brisbane, Australia